Smokes Like Lightning is an album by the blues musician Lightnin' Hopkins, recorded in Texas in 1962 and released on the Bluesville label the following year.

Reception

AllMusic reviewer Greg Adams stated: " A brief and uneven album, Smokes Like Lightnin''' is less compelling than Hopkins' '50s recordings, but strikes an appealingly lazy acoustic groove". The Penguin Guide to Blues Recordings'' said "the quality of Lightnin's performances is variable".

Track listing
All compositions by Sam "Lightnin'" Hopkins 
 "T-Model Blues" – 2:46
 "Jackstropper Blues" – 3:22
 "You Cook All Right" – 4:15
 "My Black Name" – 3:56
 "You Never Miss Your Water" – 2:36
 "Let's Do the Susie-Q" – 3:39
 "Ida Mae" – 5:26
 "Smokes Like Lightning" – 5:13
 "Prison Farm Blues" – 4:30

Personnel

Performance
Lightnin' Hopkins – guitar, vocals
Billy Bizor – harmonica, vocals (tracks 4 & 7)
Buster Pickens – piano (track 9)
Donald Cooks – bass (track 9)
Spider Kilpatrick – drums (tracks 4, 7 & 9)

Production
 Mack McCormick – supervision

References

Lightnin' Hopkins albums
1963 albums
Bluesville Records albums